Capitán Fuentes Martínez Airport,  is an airport  northeast of Porvenir, a port city off the Strait of Magellan in the Magallanes Region of Chile.

East approach and departure are partially over the water.

Airlines and destinations

See also

Transport in Chile
List of airports in Chile

References

External links
OpenStreetMap - Capitán Fuentes Martínez
OurAirports - Capitán Fuentes Martínez

Airports in Tierra del Fuego Province, Chile